The 2002 NCAA Division I Indoor Track and Field Championships were contested to determine the individual and team national champions of men's and women's NCAA collegiate indoor track and field events in the United States after the 2001–02 season, the 38th annual meet for men and 20th annual meet for women.

The championships were held at the Randal Tyson Track Center at the University of Arkansas in Fayetteville, Arkansas.

Tennessee won the men's title, the Volunteers' first.

LSU won the women's title, the Lady Tigers' ninth and first since 1997.

Qualification
All teams and athletes from Division I indoor track and field programs were eligible to compete for this year's individual and team titles.

Team standings 
 Note: Top 10 only
 Scoring: 6 points for a 1st-place finish in an event, 4 points for 2nd, 3 points for 3rd, 2 points for 4th, and 1 point for 5th
 (DC) = Defending Champions
 † = Participation vacated by NCAA Committee on Infractions

Men's title
 64 teams scored at least one point

Women's title
 54 teams scored at least one point

References

NCAA Indoor Track and Field Championships
Ncaa Indoor Track And Field Championships
Ncaa Indoor Track And Field Championships